The BCW Can-Am Television Championship was a second-tier title contested for in the Ontario-based professional wrestling promotion Border City Wrestling.

Title history

Combined reigns

Notes

References

External links
Can-Am Television Championship history at wrestling-titles.com
 BCW Can-Am Television Championship

Border City Wrestling championships
Television wrestling championships
International professional wrestling championships
North American professional wrestling championships